The Sportplatz Memellandallee is an American Football stadium for the Hamburg Blue Devils American football team in Altona-Nord, Hamburg, Germany. It was built in 2005. From 2005 to 2008 it was called eVendi Arena after a temporary sponsor.

External links 
evendi-arena.de

American football venues in Germany
Sports venues in Hamburg
Buildings and structures in Altona, Hamburg